Major General Sir Herbert Aveling Raitt,  (August 1858 − 8 November 1935) was a senior British Army officer.

Military career
Raitt was commissioned into the 80th Regiment of Foot in March 1878, and saw action in the Anglo-Zulu War in 1879. He served as commanding officer of the 1st Battalion the South Staffordshire Regiment in South Africa in the Second Boer War. He became General Officer Commanding South Midland Division in April 1908, before being sent out to India as commander of the Mandalay Brigade in May 1913. He went on to be General Officer Commanding the Burma Division in October 1914 and led the response to the Kachin Rising of January and February 1915 before retiring in November 1918.

References

1858 births
1935 deaths
South Staffordshire Regiment officers
British Army generals of World War I
Knights Commander of the Order of the Indian Empire
Companions of the Order of the Bath